The 2020 Colorado Republican presidential primary took place in the US state of Colorado on March 3, 2020.

Background
Various state Republican parties had cancelled their state primaries or caucuses, including Nevada, South Carolina and Kansas. This was going to be the case in Colorado, but advertising executive Robert Ardini filed on the first day permitted, triggering a law that states that the primary cannot be cancelled if more than one person has filed. Ardini was followed by perennial candidate Rocky de la Fuente, former governor Bill Weld, incumbent Donald Trump, Matthew John Matern, Joe Walsh, and Zoltan Istvan. De La Fuente, who was on the list when the ballot order was being decided, was not on the final ballot list, having withdrawn his name because of the state's "sore loser" law.

Procedure
The primary was held by mail. Overseas and military voters were sent ballots on January 18, 2020, and in-state voters were sent them on February 10. The primary lasted until Super Tuesday (March 3) when all envelopes were opened and votes counted.

The state uses a "winner-take-most" system. If a candidate wins 50% or more of the vote, it's "winner-take-all". Otherwise, delegates are proportionally allocated to candidates who received 20% or more of the vote.

Results

Results by county

See also
 2020 Colorado Democratic presidential primary

References

Colorado Republican
Republican primary
Colorado Republican primaries